Damaris may refer to:

A given name:
Damaris (biblical figure), woman mentioned in the New Testament
Damaris Aguirre (born 1977), Mexican weightlifter
Damaris Carbaugh (born 1955), American gospel singer and teacher
Damaris Cudworth Masham (1659–1708), English philosopher
Damaris Egurrola (born 1999), Spanish footballer
Damaris Evans (born 1975), British fashion designer and creative director
Damaris Hayman (1929–2021), British actress
Damaris Johnson (born 1989), American footballer
Damaris Lewis (born 1990) American model
Damaris Mallma Porras (born 1986), Peruvian folk singer
Damaris Page (1610–1669) also known as "Damarose Page", London brothel keeper, entrepreneur and property developer
Damaris Phillips (born 1980), American chef

Other:
"Damaris", song by Patrick Wolf from The Bachelor
"Damaris", song by The Rentals from Lost in Alphaville

See also
Damari